Krzanowski (feminine Krzanowska, plural Krzanowscy) is a Polish surname. Notable people with the surname include:

Andrzej Krzanowski (1951–1990), Polish composer and accordionist
Grażyna Krzanowska (born 1952), wife of Andrzej Krzanowski

Polish-language surnames